Scott National Park is a national park in the South West region of Western Australia,  south of Perth.

It is based on the catchment area of the Scott River and the eastern bank of the Blackwood River, and occurs in part on the Scott Coastal Plain.
It has a population of honey possum in the park.

It has had reviews of its flora and fauna due to the proximity of mining exploration and activity.

See also
 Protected areas of Western Australia

References

National parks of Western Australia
Protected areas established in 1959
South West (Western Australia)
Warren bioregion